Agrilus angelicus, known generally as the oak twig girdler or Pacific oak twig girdler, is a species of metallic wood-boring beetle in the family Buprestidae. It is found in North America.

References

Further reading

 
 
 

angelicus
Beetles of North America
Taxa named by George Henry Horn
Beetles described in 1891
Articles created by Qbugbot